The 2014–15 season was Pécsi Mecsek FC's 50th competitive season, 4th consecutive season in the OTP Bank Liga, where it finished 11th and 64th year in existence as a football club. Among the championship, the team competed in the Hungarian Cup and the Ligakupa. Both competitions saw Pécs MFC eliminated in the round of 16.

Background

Despite finishing seventh in the previous season, reaching their best result in the last ten years, coaching duo Gábor Márton and Emil Lőrincz were sacked, and György Véber was appointed as new manager in early June. Former player of the club, Árpád Kulcsár was announced as assistant coach, whereas Zoltán Bogyay Jr. will be in charge as goalkeeper coach.

The club's top scorer of the last season, Krisztián Koller left the team and joined Nyíregyháza Spartacus FC together with Ferenc Fodor, however the rest of the squad will continue in Pécs for the season.

Squad

Current squad
As of 19 October 2014.

Transfers

Summer

In:

Out:

Winter

In:

Out:

Statistics

Appearances and goals
Last updated on 26 October 2014.

|-
|colspan="14"|Youth players:

|-
|colspan="14"|Players no longer at the club:
|}

Top scorers
Includes all competitive matches. The list is sorted by shirt number when total goals are equal.

Last updated on 26 October 2014

Disciplinary record
Includes all competitive matches. Players with 1 card or more included only.

Last updated on 26 October 2014

Overall
{|class="wikitable"
|-
|Games played || 19 (12 OTP Bank Liga, 3 Hungarian Cup and 4 Hungarian League Cup)
|-
|Games won || 7 (2 OTP Bank Liga, 3 Hungarian Cup and 2 Hungarian League Cup)
|-
|Games drawn || 5 (4 OTP Bank Liga, 0 Hungarian Cup and 1 Hungarian League Cup)
|-
|Games lost || 7 (6 OTP Bank Liga, 0 Hungarian Cup and 1 Hungarian League Cup)
|-
|Goals scored || 29
|-
|Goals conceded || 25
|-
|Goal difference || +4
|-
|Yellow cards || 36
|-
|Red cards || 2
|-
|rowspan="2"|Worst discipline ||  Péter Pölöskei (4 , 1 )
|-
|  Danijel Romić (4 , 1 )
|-
|rowspan="1"|Best result || 5–0 (A) v Kozármisleny - Magyar Kupa - 23-09-2014
|-
|rowspan="1"|Worst result || 0–4 (H) v MTK - OTP Bank Liga - 26-07-2014
|-
|rowspan="1"|Most appearances ||  Lóránd Szatmári (19 appearances)
|-
|rowspan="3"|Top scorer ||  Dávid Wittrédi (4 goals)
|-
|  Róbert Kővári (4 goals)
|-
|  Dávid Márkvárt (4 goals)
|-
|Points || 29/57 (50.88%)
|-

Nemzeti Bajnokság I

Matches

Classification

Results summary

Results by round

Hungarian Cup

Pécsi MFC started its Hungarian Cup campaign of the season at Szászvár a nearby town in Baranya county, against the local team of the Hungarian fourth division. Pécsi MFC proceeded to the next round with a comfortable win of 3-0 with some of the young players on the pitch.

League Cup

References

External links
 Eufo
 Official Website
 UEFA
 fixtures and results

Pécsi MFC seasons
Hungarian football clubs 2014–15 season